The 2023 Stadium Super Trucks Series will be the eleventh season of the Stadium Super Trucks. The season will begin with the Grand Prix of Long Beach.

Gavin Harlien enters as the defending champion.

Schedule
Long Beach, which has hosted SST since the inaugural season in 2013, returns to the schedule for 2023.

References

Stadium Super Trucks
Stadium Super Trucks